Scopula ferrilineata is a moth of the family Geometridae. It was described by Frederic Moore in 1888. It is found in Darjeeling, India.

References

Moths described in 1888
Moths of Asia
ferrilineata
Taxa named by Frederic Moore